Krasnoufimsky (masculine), Krasnoufimskaya (feminine), or Krasnoufimskoye (neuter) may refer to:
Krasnoufimsky District, a district of Sverdlovsk Oblast, Russia
Krasnoufimsky Urban Okrug, the municipal formation which this district is incorporated as
Krasnoufimsky Uyezd (1781–1923), an administrative division of Perm Governorate, Russian Empire (and later the Russian SFSR)